←2010 - 2011 - 2012→

This is a list of Japanese television dramas often called doramas by fans.

Networks

NHK
NTV (Nihon TV)
YTV (Yomiuri TV)
TBS
MBS
CX (Fuji TV)
KTV (Kansai TV)
THK (Tokai TV)
EX (TV Asahi)
ABC
TX (TV Tokyo)
WOWOW

Winter (January to March)

Specials

Spring (April to June)

Specials

Summer (July to September)

Specials

Autumn (October to December)

See also
 List of Japanese television dramas

 List of Japanese Television Dramas
2011 in Japanese television